Charles Wakefield may refer to:

Charles Wakefield (cricketer) (1900-1969), South African cricketer
Charles Wakefield, 1st Viscount Wakefield (1859–1941), English businessman, founded of the Castrol lubricants company
Charles Wakefield (numismatist) (1834–1919), British artist, teacher and museum curator

See also
Charles Wakefield Cadman